Bovingdon Green may refer to:

 Bovingdon Green, Buckinghamshire
 Bovingdon Green, Hertfordshire